The Federation of Korean Industries (FKI) is a major economic organization in South Korea. Founded in 1961, it has more than 600 members among Korean industries and companies. Leading conglomerates such as Samsung (Byung-Chul LEE), Hyundai (Ju-yung CHUNG), SK (Jong-Hyun CHEY), and LG Corporation (Ja Kyung KOO) has been served as the Chairman of FKI. Current FKI Chairman is Chang Soo HUH, Honorary Chairman of GS Holdings Corp. He is representing FKI and Korean business community since 2011. FKI is located in Yeoido, Seoul, Korea.

References

External links

Organizations based in South Korea
Organizations established in 1961